Cauho is a Loloish language of northern Laos. It is divergent with the Bisoid (Phunoi) branch. Laos is in Asia.

References

Udomkool, Kitjapol. 2006. A phonological comparison of selected Bisoid varieties. M.A. dissertation. Chiang Mai: Payap University.
Wright, Pamela Sue. n.d. Singsali (Phunoi) Speech Varieties Of Phongsali Province. m.s.

Southern Loloish languages
Languages of Laos